William Holles was Lord Mayor of London.

William Holles or Hollis may also refer to:

William Holles (MP) (1510–1591), MP for Nottinghamshire
William Hollis, cricketer

See also
William Holle, engraver